That's So Raven: Psychic on the Scene is a point-and-click video game based on Disney's That's So Raven television series. In the video game, Raven has to stop the Thompson Theater from closing.

Gameplay
The player has to go through several locations from the television series while collecting items and talking to characters from the show. The only way for the player to get inside certain areas is by making Raven change into a disguise. There is a fashion area of the game where the player can change how Raven looks in a variety of ways. The game also contains several mini-games.

Reception
Lucas M. Thomas of IGN said that "most games like this deserve ridicule, but that this one doesn't because the fans will like it". Common Sense Media said that the game is well-designed and that it has high entertainment value, but that the game might be too easy for some kids. Matt Paddock of Game Vortex said that the only flaw is the "bad grammar and negative-talk."

References

2006 video games
Adventure games
Disney video games
North America-exclusive video games
Nintendo DS games
Nintendo DS-only games
That's So Raven
Video games about psychic powers
Video games based on television series
Video games developed in the United States
Video games featuring female protagonists
Single-player video games

Video games featuring black protagonists